Ana Belén Fernández Casero (born 1974) is a Spanish politician of the Spanish Socialist Workers' Party (PSOE), who serves as member of the 13th Congress of Deputies representing Cáceres.

Biography 
Born on 22 December 1974 in Cáceres, she earned a diplomature in Labor Relations at the University of Valencia. With a career as civil servant employed by the Regional Government of Extremadura (where she also held the role of union representative), she ran 2nd in the Spanish Socialist Workers' Party list for the 2015 Cáceres municipal election, and became city councillor, remaining active in the opposition to the People's Party local government for the 2015–2019 period.

She ran 1st in PSOE list for Cáceres for the Congress of Deputies vis-à-vis the 2019 general election. Elected, she became a member of the 13th term of the Lower House.

References 

1974 births
Living people
Members of the 13th Congress of Deputies (Spain)
People from Cáceres, Spain
Spanish municipal councillors
Spanish Socialist Workers' Party politicians
Women members of the Congress of Deputies (Spain)